A social crisis (or alternately a societal crisis) is a crisis in which the basic structure of a society experiences some drastic interruption or decline.

Overview
A social crisis can be sudden and immediate, or it can be some gross societal inequity which might take decades to develop, or it could be a wide range of scenarios or situations which fall somewhere between those  conceptual modes. This can include 
a political crisis such as  a coup d'etat, or mass civil disorder, due to political and/or social disorder, due to military conflict, or  mass protests, or dysfunction within any part of or the central body of governemnt. 
an economic crisis which can range from or include a possible financial crisis, currency crisis, or any economic shock, or any breakdown or major dysfunctions within the economic system , 
or a major upheaval due to a natural disaster, which can include severe weather, or epidemics, or drought, or famine, or other events related to the natural world. 

A social crisis can consist of one, some, or all of these factors, in any combination.

See also
 Economic crisis
 Societal collapse

References

Crisis
Social crises